The Sofia tram network is a vital part of the public transportation system of Sofia, the capital of Bulgaria. It began operation on January 1, 1901.

History 

On 1 December 1898, the capital municipality gave concessions for building tram lines to French and Belgian companies . Construction took place for a little more than a year and the first tram line was inaugurated on 1 January 1901.

Between 1901 and 1931, many motor cars and trailers were purchased from different European manufacturers. In 1931 Bulgaria started building their own carriages under the supervision of the engineer Teodosiy Kardalev. These were known as Kardalev's carriages. In 1936 the first Bulgarian motor cars were produced under the brand DTO (Дирекция на трамваите и осветлението - Direktsia na tramvaite i osvetlenieto: Department for trams and lighting, owned by Sofia municipality). Initially old frames were used for the production. 

In 1934 the first large tram depot was built in the Krasno selo district. In 1951 there was constructed a factory to build newer model tram cars. 

In 1951 the T4M-221 (Republic), which is considered the highest-quality Bulgarian tram, was produced in DTO. The T4M-221 is the first Bulgarian four-row tram. The "Republic" model was in production in 1951 and 1959, bearing the numbers 221 to 240. They also had trailers numbered 521-544. The motor cars, along with their trailers, mainly worked on line 5. They were assigned to the Krasno Selo tram depot (later Krasna Polyana). In 1981 motor car 240 and wagon 540 were rebuilt and put into operation for about a year. The 240 motor car and trailer 538 are still alive today and are expected to be restored. The original stock was 240 + 540, but 540 disappears from the Krasna Polyana depot in unexplained circumstances and again in unexpected circumstances, trailer 538 is found. The,,Republika" model was in operation until 1978.

This tram manufacturer (known as Трамваен завод - Tramvaen zavod: Tram plant) was named "Трамкар" (Tramkar: Tram car) in 1990 and was a registered company Tramkar till 2008. Through 1959 it produced 155 DTO and Republika motors, the first fully Bulgarian-built trams. The last tram, T8M-900 was delivered in 1991 and is still in use. Since then the factory has been used to repair and renovate old trams.

In 2017 the network was complemented with 28 second-hand Be 4/6 S "gherkin" trams partly donated from the BVB section of the tram network of Basel. The trams were constructed in 1990-91 and had low-floor sections inserted in their centre in 1997-99. They replaced older vehicles on lines 6, 8 and 12.

Sofia's first standard gauge tram line was opened in 1987. Eight years later, in 1995, the second standard gauge line was finished. No other tram lines have been built since then, as Sofia has focused its efforts on the construction of its metro system.

Lines 
As of May 2022, the following lines operate:

Gallery

See also 

 List of tram and light rail transit systems
 Sofia Metro
 Sofia Public Transport
 Trolleybuses in Sofia

References

External links 

 Sofia Urban Mobility Center: Urban Transport – Route network
 Sofia (trams) at UrbanRail.net

Transport in Sofia
Sofia
Narrow gauge railways in Bulgaria
Tram transport in Europe
1901 in rail transport